The Rodbav gas field is a natural gas field in Șoarș, Brașov County, Romania. It was discovered in 1935 and developed by and Romgaz. It began production in 1938 and produces natural gas and condensates.

References

Natural gas fields in Romania